Pak Yong-ryong (born 14 December 1980) is a North Korean diver. He competed at the 2000 Summer Olympics and the 2004 Summer Olympics.

References

1980 births
Living people
North Korean male divers
Olympic divers of North Korea
Divers at the 2000 Summer Olympics
Divers at the 2004 Summer Olympics
Place of birth missing (living people)